Eresing is a municipality in the district of Landsberg in Bavaria in Germany.

Transport
The municipality has a railway station, on the Mering–Weilheim line.

References

Landsberg (district)